301st may refer to:

301st Air Refueling Squadron, an inactive United States Air Force (USAF) unit
301st Air Refueling Wing, an inactive unit of the United States Air Force 
301st Airlift Squadron, United States Air Force Reserve squadron
301st Bombardment Squadron, inactive United States Air Force unit
301st Bombardment Squadron (Light), inactive United States Air Force unit
301st Fighter Squadron, a United States Air Force Reserve squadron
301st Fighter Wing, Air Reserve Component (ARC) of the United States Air Force
301st Heavy Tank Battalion (United States), the mechanized unit that conducted American tank combat in World War I
301st Infantry Battalion (Ready Reserve), one of the battalions of the Philippine Army Reserve Command
301st Infantry Brigade (United Kingdom) (301 Bde) was a formation of the British Army towards the end of World War II
301st Intelligence Squadron (301 IS), an intelligence unit located at Misawa AB, Japan
301st Military Intelligence Battalion (United States), located in Phoenix, Arizona
301st Operations Group, flying component of the 301st Fighter Wing
301st Rescue Squadron (301 RQS), part of the 920th Rescue Wing at Patrick Air Force Base, Florida

See also
301 (number)
301 (disambiguation)
301, the year 301 (CCCI) of the Julian calendar
301 BC